Tupaia may refer to:
 Tupaia (navigator), an 18th-century Tahitian navigator, who accompanied James Cook on his first voyage of discovery
 Tupaia (mammal), a genus of treeshrew